Sally Regenhard (born November 4, 1946) is an American activist who has become one of the leading voices for the families of the victims of the September 11 attacks.  A  former long-time resident of Co-op City in The Bronx in New York City who has degrees in behavioral sciences and gerontology and has worked in the nursing home industry for over 20 years, Regenhard became an advocate for skyscraper safety after the death of her 28-year-old son, Christian, a probationary firefighter with the New York City Fire Department, who perished in the collapse of the World Trade Center on September 11, 2001.

Activism
Along with her husband Al, her daughter Christina, and Monica Gabrielle, a widow who lost her husband Richard as a result of the collapse of the towers, they founded the Skyscraper Safety Campaign, a national non-profit organization that has four main goals:

  Demand a  federal investigation (via the use of subpoenas) into the collapse of the World Trade Center, including information on its design, evacuation procedures, and "firefighting techniques".
 To promote improved compliance of  building and fire codes in New York City and nationwide, and assuring the safety of firefighters and residents (and workers) who reside and work in such structures.
 To educate "codes groups" in allowing fire departments in having a say in the building of new skyscrapers. The "code groups" will be assembled by a mixed group of fire services officials and engineers, replacing the present "code groups" who are composed mainly of bureaucrats, builders, and others who have little or no knowledge of fire safety.
 To have say and voice in the construction of the Freedom Tower and all other structures built at Ground Zero, thus assuring that newly revised fire safety codes are enforced.

Regenhard has also worked to honor her son's legacy. On July 18, 2006, Sally and her family, with the assistance of then-Senator Hillary Clinton, dedicated the Christian Regenhard Center for Emergency Response Studies at John Jay College of Criminal Justice located in Manhattan. Currently it is a research center offering seminars, lectures, and doing research and contracts with emergency response organizations.  The College dedicated its own 9/11 Memorial in 2011. 

The credits page of Robert Greenwald's viral videos series, The REAL RUDY, offer "very special thanks to Regenhard.

Views about Rudolph Giuliani

In recent years, Regenhard has become one of the most vocal and visible critics of Rudolph Giuliani, who was Mayor of New York City at the time of the attacks. Riding on a wave of popularity for his handling of the crisis, Giuliani became a household name throughout the world. With plenty of media coverage and high public approval ratings, he became a major candidate to win the Republican nomination for the 2008 presidential race.

She made national headlines in May 2004, when during a televised public hearing on the National Commission on Terrorist Attacks, she interrupted Giuliani while he was giving a speech. She has made appearances on various news-related programs on such networks as CNN and C-SPAN.

In an article  published by New York Daily News in September 2006, Regenhard was quoted saying, "There's a large and growing number of both FDNY families, FDNY members, former and current, and civilian families who want to expose the true failures of the Giuliani administration when it comes to 9/11," and that she intends to "Swift Boat" Giuliani and his campaign.

Post 9/11
Regenhard has voiced her opposition to the construction of the controversial Park51 project that will be located in a building near Ground Zero. The proposed Park51 (named after the building's street address of 51 Park Place) project, which will include both a mosque and an Islamic cultural center, has been the target of many opponents who claim that it may attract Islamic extremists and who consider it an insult to the victims of the September 11 terrorist attacks.  Regenhard, who was interviewed by the New York Times claims that the construction of the center would be "sacrilege on sacred ground." In response to accusations that opponents to the project were anti-Muslim, Regenhard replied "People are being accused of being anti-Muslim and racist, but this is simply a matter of sensitivity. It’s hard enough to go down to that pit of hell and death."

Regenhard resides in Yonkers, New York with her husband.

See also
 9/11 Family Steering Committee
 Health effects arising from the September 11, 2001 attacks

References

External links
Skyscraper Safety Campaign
Regenhard's testimory to the 9/11 Commission
Sally Regenhard interview from YouTube
Sally Regenhard & Monica Iken interview from The New York Times
Sally Regenhard discusses closing of Guantanamo Bay Base from MSNBC

Christian Regenhard memorial website
The Christian Regenhard Center for Emergency Response Studies official website

1946 births
Living people
People from Co-op City, Bronx
People associated with the September 11 attacks
Activists from New York (state)